Bundure is a rural community in the central south part of the Riverina.  It is situated by road, about 25 kilometres south west of Widgiewa and 33 kilometres north east of Jerilderie.  In 2006, Bundure had a population of 274 people.

The place name Bundure is derived from the local Aboriginal word Bundoora meaning "place of meeting of many Kangaroos".

Bundure Post Office opened on 1 September 1926, was closed between 1930 and 1934, and finally closed in 1973.

Notes and references

External links

Towns in the Riverina
Towns in New South Wales
Murrumbidgee Council